Laimutė Baikauskaitė (born June 10, 1956 in Gaideliai, Klaipėda County) is a retired female middle distance runner, who represented the USSR and later Lithuania. She competed mainly in the 1500 metres, and won an Olympic silver medal in 1988.

References
sports-reference

1956 births
Living people
People from Šilutė District Municipality
Soviet female middle-distance runners
Lithuanian female middle-distance runners
Olympic athletes of the Soviet Union
Olympic silver medalists for the Soviet Union
Athletes (track and field) at the 1988 Summer Olympics
Medalists at the 1988 Summer Olympics
Olympic silver medalists in athletics (track and field)